Stringtown House is located east of Bloomfield in rural Davis County, United States.  Stringtown was the first town established in the county.  It was originally named Harpersvilie, then it was changed to Dover, before it became Stringtown.  At one time the town had a mill, store, and hotel and other houses, but none of them are extant.  Byron Wilson built this house in 1832.  It is believed to be the oldest house still standing in the county, and the only one in its original condition.  It is a 1½-story frame Saltbox structure was used as a stagecoach stop.  The house was listed on the National Register of Historic Places in 1974.

References

Houses completed in 1832
Saltbox architecture in Iowa
Houses in Davis County, Iowa
National Register of Historic Places in Davis County, Iowa
Houses on the National Register of Historic Places in Iowa